This is a list of all NFL players who had outstanding performances throughout the 1950s and have been compiled together into this fantasy group. The team was selected by voters of the Pro Football Hall of Fame retroactively in 1969 to mark the league's 50th anniversary.

Notes:
 Team that belonged to the All-America Football Conference for at least part of the player's tenure

References 

National Football League All-Decade Teams
National Football League records and achievements
1950s in sports
Foot
Foot
National Football League lists